The Osam is a river in northern Bulgaria. Its drainage basin is in between that of the river Vit to the west and the Yantra system to the east. In Troyan, the black and white Osam join. It runs north towards Lovech, then north-east until Letnitsa and Levski, where it turns north-west until it flows into the river Danube 5 km west of the town of Nikopol. The ancient name of the river was Assamus.

References

Rivers of Bulgaria
Landforms of Lovech Province
Landforms of Pleven Province